Coach Snoop is a 2018 American docu-series, following hip-hop artist Snoop Dogg as he coaches his youth team Snoop's Steelers in the Snoop Youth Football League (SYFL).

Premise
Coach Snoop follows Snoop Dogg as he coaches his youth team Snoop's Steelers in the Snoop Youth Football League (SYFL). The SYFL was set up by Snoop Dogg in 2005 as an after school programme in the Los Angeles area to keep kids stay focused on their goals.

Cast
 Snoop Dogg

Release
The series was released on February 2, 2018 on Netflix streaming platform.

References

External links
 
 
 

2018 American television series debuts
English-language Netflix original programming
Documentary television series about music
Documentary television series about sports
Netflix original documentary television series
Snoop Dogg